Erigeron vicarius is an Asian species of flowering plants in the family Asteraceae. It grows in alpine meadows in Xinjiang, Uzbekistan, and Kazakhstan.

Erigeron vicarius is a perennial herb up to 28 cm (11 inches) tall, producing a short, branching rhizomes. Its flower heads have blue ray florets surrounding yellow disc florets.

References

vicarius
Flora of Asia
Plants described in 1957
Taxa named by Victor Botchantsev